In computer science, Programming Computable Functions (PCF) is a typed functional language introduced by Gordon Plotkin in 1977, based on previous unpublished material by Dana Scott. It can be considered to be an extended version of the typed lambda calculus or a simplified version of modern typed functional languages such as ML or Haskell.

A fully abstract model for PCF was first given by Robin Milner. However, since Milner's model was essentially based on the syntax of PCF it was considered less than satisfactory. The first two fully abstract models not employing syntax were formulated during the 1990s. These models are based on game semantics and Kripke logical relations. For a time it was felt that neither of these models was completely satisfactory, since they were not effectively presentable. However, Ralph Loader demonstrated that no effectively presentable fully abstract model could exist, since the question of program equivalence in the finitary fragment of PCF is not decidable.

Syntax
The types of PCF are inductively defined as
 nat is a type
 For types σ and τ, there is a type σ → τ

A context is a list of pairs x : σ, where x is a variable name and σ is a type, such that no variable name is duplicated. One then defines typing judgments of terms-in-context in the usual way for the following syntactical constructs:

 Variables (if x : σ is part of a context Γ, then Γ ⊢ x : σ)
 Application (of a term of type σ → τ to a term of type σ)
 λ-abstraction
 The Y fixed point combinator (making terms of type σ out of terms of type σ → σ)
 The successor (succ) and predecessor (pred) operations on nat and the constant 0
 The conditional if with the typing rule:
 
 (nats will be interpreted as booleans here with a convention like zero denoting truth, and any other number denoting falsity)

Semantics

Denotational semantics
A relatively straightforward semantics for the language is the Scott model. In this model,

 Types are interpreted as certain domains.
  (the natural numbers with a bottom element adjoined, with the flat ordering)
 A context  is interpreted as the product 
 Terms in context  are interpreted as continuous functions 
 Variable terms are interpreted as projections
 Lambda abstraction and application are interpreted by making use of the cartesian closed structure of the category of domains and continuous functions
 Y is interpreted by taking the least fixed point of the argument

This model is not fully abstract for PCF; but it is fully abstract for the language obtained by adding a parallel or operator to PCF.

Notes

References 

 Appeared as

External links
 Introduction to RealPCF
 Lexer and Parser for PCF written in SML

Programming languages created in 1977
Academic programming languages
Educational programming languages
Functional languages
Programming language theory